Dubki (Seto: Tupka) is a village in Pechorsky District of Pskov Oblast, Russia. It is situated on a peninsula on the shore of Lake Peipsi-Pihkva. Before 1920 it was a part of Pskov Governorate. From 1920 to 1944, it was a part of Petseri County of Estonia, but in 1944 it was reassigned to the RSFSR.

Presently, Dubki is an exclave. There is no direct land connection with Russia, which, during the Soviet times, was not a problem, as no border control between the republics existed. The unratified 2005 Estonian-Russian border treaty did not change the situation. As of 2010 there were not any people living in Dubki.

See also
 Sankovo-Medvezhye

References

Sources
 Pictures of the area (Internet Archive)
   (Internet Archive)
 Hidden Europe.  July 2005, #3.  
 Численность постоянного населения муниципальных образований Псковской области по окончательным итогам Всероссийской переписи населения 2010 года. Verified on 25 November 2014. Seen on 25 November 2014.

Rural localities in Pskov Oblast
Enclaves and exclaves